Italo Terzoli  (18 January 1924 – 13 May 2008) was an Italian author, playwright, screenwriter, television and radio writer.

Born in Milan, Terzoli started his career as a playwright in the early 1950s, collaborating first with Carlo Silva and later with Renzo Puntoni a number of musical comedies for popular comedians of the time such as Walter Chiari, Sorelle Nava, and the couple Sandra Mondaini and Raimondo Vianello. In the  1960s he wrote a number of stage comedies together with Marcello Marchesi. In 1971 he started a proficuous collaboration with the writer Enrico Vaime; their debut novel, Amore significa, was a bestseller and got over thirty editions. From 1977, the couple also wrote  a series of musicals and comedy plays for Garinei & Giovannini.

References

External links 
 
 

1924 births
2008 deaths
Writers from Milan
20th-century Italian screenwriters
Italian male screenwriters
Italian dramatists and playwrights
Italian television writers
Italian radio writers
Italian male dramatists and playwrights
Male television writers
20th-century Italian male writers